Gimbach is a small river of Hesse, Germany. It flows into the Liederbach in Kelkheim.

See also

List of rivers of Hesse

Rivers of Hesse
Rivers of the Taunus
Rivers of Germany